Joe Jones may refer to:

Art and entertainment
 Joe Jones (artist) (1909–1963), American painter, muralist, and lithographer
 Philly Joe Jones (1923–1985), American modern jazz drummer
 Joe Jones (singer) (1926–2005), American rhythm and blues singer and composer
 Joe Jones (Fluxus musician) (1934–1993), American avant-garde musician associated with Fluxus
 Boogaloo Joe Jones (born 1940), American jazz guitarist who first recorded as Joe Jones

Sports
 Joe Jones (footballer) (1887–1941), Welsh international footballer who also played for Stoke, Crystal Palace and Coventry
 Joe Jones (rugby) (1916–1974), Welsh rugby union and rugby league footballer of the 1930s and 1940s
 Joe Jones (baseball) (born 1941), American professional baseball coach and manager
 Joe Jones (cyclist) (born 1944), Canadian Olympic cyclist
 Joe Jones (defensive end) (born 1948), American football player for the NFL's Cleveland Browns
 Joe Jones (tight end) (born 1962), American football player for the NFL's Indianapolis Colts
 Joe Jones (basketball) (born 1965), current head men's basketball coach at Boston University
 Joe Jones (rugby union) (born 1995), Welsh rugby union player

See also
 Jo Jones (1911–1985), American swing era jazz drummer
 Joey Jones (disambiguation)
 Joseph Jones (disambiguation)